The Backbench Business Committee of the British House of Commons was created on 15 June 2010 through the adoption of a new standing order. It was created soon after 2010 general election, but had been proposed during the previous Parliament by the Wright Committee on Reform of the House of Commons in its report of 12 November 2009.

Remit
The committee is responsible for determining, on behalf of backbench members (i.e., members who are not Ministers of the Crown or shadow ministers), the business before the House for approximately one day each week. This includes Thursday sittings in the parallel debating chamber, known as Westminster Hall, which are considered half days. The amendments to Standing Order 14 give the committee 35 days per session, of which at least 27 are taken on the floor of the House (as opposed to Westminster Hall). The one-and-one-half-hour Topical Debates, which count as quarter days, are also within the ambit of the committee.

Membership
As set out by Standing Order 152, the committee consists of a chair and seven other members to be elected at the beginning of each session. The chair, who must be an opposition member, is elected under the alternative vote method in a manner similar to other select committee chairs. The other members are selected under the single transferable vote method with the stipulation that the eight members (including the Chair) reflect a distribution of the seats made by the Speaker, which is to reflect the party composition of the House of Commons. In addition, at least two men and two women must be elected. Ministers of the Crown, Parliamentary Private Secretaries, and 'principal opposition frontbench spokespersons' are prohibited from standing for election as chair or as a member. The Committee's Chair is currently Ian Mearns. As of November 2022, the membership is as follows:

Changes since 2021

2020 election
The chair was elected on 27 January 2020, with members being announced on 2 March 2020.

Changes 2020-2021

2017 election
The chair was elected on 12 July 2017, with members being announced on 11 September 2017.

Changes 2017-2019

2016 election
The chair was elected on 24 May 2016, with members being announced on 13 June 2016.

Changes 2016-2017

2015 election
The chair was elected on 18 June 2015, with members being announced on 20 July 2015.

Changes 2015-2016

2014 election
The chair was elected on 11 June 2014, with members being elected on 30 June 2014.

2013 election
The chair was elected on 15 May 2013, with members being elected on 10 June 2013.

Changes 2013-2014

2012 election
The chair was elected on 16 May 2012, with members being elected on 12 June 2012.

2010 election
The chair was elected on 22 June 2010, with members being elected on 29 June 2010.

By-elections 2010-2012

Review
When it created the committee, the House resolved to review the committee‘s work at the beginning of the 2011/12 session. The Leader of the House of Commons, Sir George Young, stated that the purpose of the review was to help reach the next phase of implementing the Wright Committee report: setting up a committee to manage substantially all House business.

References

Select Committees of the British House of Commons
2010 establishments in the United Kingdom